William Dugan may refer to:

Bill Dugan (born 1959), former professional American football player, offensive lineman
Bill Dugan (baseball) (1864–1921), American baseball catcher

See also
William Duggan (disambiguation)
Dugan (surname)